Meri Marjatta Utrio (née Vitikainen; 23 March 1919 – 14 December 2004) was a Finnish editor and translator to Finnish.  She was married with Urho Untamo Utrio, who was the chief executive officer of the publishing company Tammi and has three children with him: Kaari (1942–) Pirkka (1943–2000) and Martti (1945–).  The first above, Kaari Utrio has written over forty historical novels as well as often non-fictional books which deal with position of women and children in the history of Europe.

Meri Utrio's sister, Pirkko Vitikainen, M.A. in Architecture, worked in the 1980s and 1900s as the City Planning Architect of Helsinki, the capital of Finland.

Works 
 Jack O'Brien: Silver Chief, Dog of the North (translation to Finnish 1957)
 Jack O'Brien: Silver Chief to the Rescue (translation to Finnish 1957)
 Jack O'Brien: The Return of Silver Chief (translation to Finnish 1958)
 Sata vuotta sitten 1886 (Finnish: One hundred years ago: 1886)  (with her son-in-law Kai Linnilä; Tammi 1886)
 Pois pula, pois puute. Kun kansa selviytyi. (No more shortages, no more want.  When Finland became self-sufficient) (with Urho Untamo Utrio)
 Silloin kerran kultaisina vuosina – elämä Suomessa vuosina 1944–1956 (The Golden Years – Life in Finland 1944–1956) (with Kai Linnilä and Kaari Utrio)

References 

Finnish translators
1919 births
2004 deaths
20th-century translators
Finnish women journalists
20th-century Finnish journalists